James Brogden (c. 1765–1842), was a British politician.

He was a Member of Parliament for Launceston  from 1796 to 1832.

References

1765 births
British MPs 1796–1800
Members of the Parliament of Great Britain for Launceston
Members of the Parliament of the United Kingdom for Launceston
1842 deaths
People educated at Eton College
UK MPs 1801–1802
UK MPs 1802–1806
UK MPs 1806–1807
UK MPs 1807–1812
UK MPs 1812–1818
UK MPs 1818–1820
UK MPs 1820–1826
UK MPs 1826–1830
UK MPs 1830–1831
UK MPs 1831–1832